Peter John Dixon (born 30 April 1944) is a former England international rugby union player.

Dixon played for Oxford University RFC in four consecutive Varsity Matches from 1967 to 1970. He played for Cumberland at county level alongside David Robinson and Butler in the back row and with Cowman at fly half. The northern section of the county championship found him playing against Gosforth and later England colleague Roger Utley and against Alan Old and Warfield (Yorkshire) and Tony Neary, Fran Cotton, Bill Beaumont and Mike Slemen (Lancashire). With several of these he played in the Northwest Counties team that in 1972, at Workington, became the first regional team to defeat a New Zealand All Black's touring team. He also played in the North of England provincial team that beat the All Blacks in 1979. He toured New Zealand in 1971 with the victorious British and Irish Lions, playing in the first, second and fourth test matches. At that time he played club rugby for Harlequins.

Dixon later worked in overseas development at Durham University, and at the University of Botswana, Institute of Adult Education.

References

External links 
 Lions profile
 Peter Dixon

1944 births
Living people
Alumni of Grey College, Durham
Alumni of the University of Oxford
British & Irish Lions rugby union players from England
Durham University RFC players
England international rugby union players
English rugby union players
Harlequin F.C. players
North of England Rugby Union team
Oxford University RFC players
People educated at St Bees School
Rugby union flankers
Rugby union players from Keighley